Awre is a village, civil parish and electoral ward in the Forest of Dean District of Gloucestershire, England, near the River Severn.

Both the parish and the electoral ward include Blakeney, Etloe, Gatcombe, Viney Hill, and Two Bridges.

According to the 2001 census, Awre had a population of 1,644, increasing to 1,714 at the 2011 census. The electoral ward gives similar figures

History
The name is from Old English; āfor "bitter or sour" and ēa "water-meadow or island" translates to "sour water-meadow".

The manor of Awre is mentioned in the Domesday Book of 1086. Together with Lydney and Alvington, the parish of Awre comprised Bledisloe Hundred. Awre was a large parish which included the tithings of Blakeney,  Bledisloe, Hagloe, and Etloe. The manors were often in royal hands or in possession of great medieval magnates. The whole of Awre parish was included within the jurisdiction of the Forest of Dean before 1228.

The village was once larger, though probably always scattered in plan. In the 17th century, shipbuilding was established in nearby Gatcombe, once an important anchorage on the Severn. By the early 19th century, the industrial and trading village of Blakeney had replaced Awre as the principal centre.

A church is mentioned in Domesday Book, and by the mid 12th century it was dedicated to St. Andrew. It was rebuilt in the mid-13th century as a large building with a long chancel and a nave and north aisle of six bays. The porch was added in the 14th century and the upper part of the tower was reconstructed in the 15th century.

The church is a Victorian restoration of the 19th century with a 15th-century font and a 15th-century oak rood screen. A medieval dugout chest stands under the tower. The graveyard contains many burials of those drowned in the Severn as a result of shipwreck or other accident.

From 1851 to 1959, the area was served by the Awre for Blakeney railway station.

References

External links

Awre Parish Council
Awre at Forest Web

 
Villages in Gloucestershire
Civil parishes in Gloucestershire
Forest of Dean